Miles Mosley is an American musician, producer and composer from Hollywood, California. He is known for his vocal and bass skills, as well as his abilities as a composer, arranger and music producer. He is also a founding member of the West Coast Get Down, a jazz collective that includes prominent musicians such as Kamasi Washington, Terrace Martin, and Thundercat. Mosley was named after the famous jazz musician Miles Davis.

Select discography
2005 – As a solo artist – Sicaceremony
2005 – Kamasi Washington – Live at 5th Street Dick's
2006 – India.Arie – Testimony: Vol. 1, Life & Relationship
2006 – As a solo artist – Taming the Proud
2007 – Chris Cornell – Carry On
2007 – Avenged Sevenfold – Avenged Sevenfold
2007 – Jonathan Davis and the SFA – Alone I Play
2007 – As a solo artist – Bear
2008 – Terrence Howard – Shine Through It
2008 – Everlast – Love, War and the Ghost of Whitey Ford
2008 – Kenny Loggins – How About Now 
2015 – Andra Day – Cheers to the Fall (album)
2015 – Kamasi Washington – The Epic2015 – Kendrick Lamar – To Pimp a Butterfly (album)
2016 – As a solo artist – "Abraham" (single) [Alpha Pup Records/World Galaxy] 
2017 – Uprising (featuring West Coast Get Down) [Universal Music/Verve Label Group] 
2018 – Kamasi Washington - Heaven and Earth
2018 – Jonathan Davis – Black Labyrinth
2019 – As a solo artist – "BROTHER" (single) [Universal Music/Verve Label Group]

References

Miles Mosley – BROTHER review
Miles Mosley – Composer
Miles Mosley – Vanity Fair
Miles Mosley – BFI

External links
Official Website
Official YouTube 
Official Instagram 
UMG/VERVE LABEL GROUP

Living people
American male musicians
American rock double-bassists
Jonathan Davis and the SFA members
Year of birth missing (living people)